Philip Simon Mauger (born ) is the current Mayor of Christchurch, defeating David Meates in the 2022 local body elections. Previously he was a one-term city councillor and construction company owner. He was sworn in on 25 October 2022 along with his deputy Pauline Cotter.

Biography
Mauger grew up in Burwood, later moving to Avonhead. In 1974 he started working for his grandfathers company Maugers Contracting, which was involved in rebuilding streets throughout the east of Christchurch. It is the only company he has worked for and later became the owner of it.

Mauger and Christchurch Mag & Turbo Warehouse owner Hayden Knighton were badly injured in 2015 when their car was sandwiched between four vehicles (including a fuel tanker) on the Great Western Highway west of Sydney necessitating a long recovery period. He suffered 21 broken bones and was in intensive care for two weeks.

Personal life
Mauger and his wife, Christene, have five children between them as well as five grandchildren. He is a motor racing enthusiast and has raced cars all over the world.

References

Mayors of Christchurch
Living people
Year of birth missing (living people)